HMS Turbulent was an  built for the Royal Navy during the First World War.

Description
The S-class destroyers were improved versions of the preceding Modified R class. They displaced . They were powered by two Brown-Curtis geared steam turbines, each driving one propeller shaft, using steam provided by two Yarrow boilers. The ships' complement was 90 officers and ratings.

Turbulent was armed with three QF  Mark IV guns in single mounts and a single 2-pounder (40 mm) "pom-pom" anti-aircraft gun. The ship was fitted with two twin mounts for  torpedoes. Two additional single mounts were positioned abreast the bridge at the break of the forecastle for 18-inch (45 cm) torpedoes. All torpedo tubes were above water and traversed to fire.

Construction and career
Turbulent was laid down on 14 November 1917 by Hawthorn Leslie and Company, launched on 29 May 1919 and completed on 10 October. The ship saw little or no active service before being struck in 1936. She was one of the obsolete destroyers handed over to the shipbreakers Thos.

Notes

Bibliography

External links
 Royal Navy - HMS Turbulent

 

S-class destroyers (1917) of the Royal Navy
Ships built on the River Tyne
1919 ships